General Foster may refer to:

David Jack Foster (1859–1948), U.S. Army brigadier general
George P. Foster (1835–1879), Union Army brevet brigadier general
Harry Wickwire Foster (1902–1964), Canadian Army major general
Hubert Foster (1855–1919), Australian Army brigadier general
Hugh F. Foster Jr. (1918–2004), U.S. Army major general
Ira Roe Foster (1811–1885), Georgia Militia brigadier general
John G. Foster (1823–1874), Union Army major general
Kent Foster (born c. 1938), Canadian Army lieutenant general
Mayhew Foster (1911–2011), U.S. Air Force brigadier general
Richard Foster (Royal Marines officer) (1879–1965), Royal Marines general
Robert Sanford Foster (1834–1903), Union Army brigadier general and brevet major general
Steven E. Foster (fl. 1970s–2010s), U.S. Air National Guard major general
William Wasbrough Foster (1875–1954), Canadian Army major general

See also
Attorney General Foster (disambiguation)